Suqeh (also Romanized as Sūqeh) is a village in Howmeh Rural District, in the Central District of Rasht County, Gilan Province, Iran. At the 2006 census, its population was 431, in 124 families.

References 

Populated places in Rasht County